Together: A New Chuck Mangione Concert is a double album recorded live at the Auditorium Theatre in Rochester, New York on May 15, 1971, and released by Mercury Records. It features the Rochester Philharmonic Orchestra; Chuck Mangione on flugelhorn; Gerry Niewood; Don Potter; Bat McGrath; Gap Mangione; Esther Satterfield; and Stanley Watson.

Track listing

Personnel
Rochester Philharmonic Orchestra
Chuck Mangione - conductor, flugelhorn, electric and acoustic piano
Gerry Niewood - soprano saxophone, tenor saxophone, baritone saxophone, flute, and alto flute
Don Potter - voice, acoustic guitar, dobro, harmonica
Bat McGrath - guitarrón, voice, Fender bass
Gap Mangione - electric piano
Esther Satterfield - voice
Stanley Watson - guitar
Steve Gadd - Drums, Tambourine

References

External links
Chuck Mangione Official Website

1970 live albums
Chuck Mangione albums
Mercury Records albums
Music of Rochester, New York